The Japanese reed bunting or ochre-rumped bunting (Emberiza yessoensis) is a bird in the family Emberizidae. The species was first described by Robert Swinhoe in 1863.

It is found in Manchuria, Korea and Japan. Its natural habitats are temperate grassland and swamps.

It is threatened by habitat loss.

Taxonomy
The bird family Emberizidae contains around 300 seed-eating species, the majority of which are found in the Americas, although the genus Emberiza, with more than 40 members, is confined to the Old World. Within its genus, the reed bunting is most closely related to the common reed bunting and the Pallas's reed bunting, which are sometimes classified as being in the genus Schoeniclus.

Subspecies
Two subspecies are recognised- E. y. continentalis, which breeds in eastern Mongolia, northeast China and Ussuriland and winters in east China and E. y. yessoensis which breeds and winters in Japan and also winters in Korea.

Description
It is 15 cm in length. Typically, it is the richest-coloured of the reed buntings, with the pinkest legs and bill in winter. Male: Dark back. Upperparts chestnut, striped black and buff on breast and sides. Nape brown but sides of neck whitish. Female: Buffy submoustachial and throat, and black malar stripes, crown dark brown streaked pale. Juvenile: Pale greyish-brown central crown stripe. Rump yellowish brown. Voice: Call 'sur-swee-ik' or 'tik'. Habitat: Open fields near water.

References

Japanese reed bunting
Birds of Manchuria
Birds of Korea
Birds of Japan
Japanese reed bunting
Taxonomy articles created by Polbot